Hemiodontichthys acipenserinus is the only species of the monotypic genus Hemiodontichthys, a genus of the family Loricariidae of catfish (order Siluriformes).

Taxonomy
This taxon is often compared with the morphologically similar Reganella depressa; Hemiodontichthys has been considered the sister genus of Reganella on the basis of osteological data. However, the similar external morphology of these two taxa could be interpreted as an evolutionary convergence, as they occupy the same ecological niche. In both, there is a rostrum and the loss of maxillary teeth; these could have evolved independently in different lineages subjected to similar environmental constraints. Considering some of the morphological characteristics of the two species, Hemiodontichthys is now believed to be part of the Loricariichthys group, while Reganella is part of the Pseudohemiodon group.

Distribution
Hemiodontichthys acipenserinus is native to the countries of Bolivia, Brazil, French Guiana, Guyana and Peru where it occurs in the Amazon, Essequibo, Oyapock, and Paraguay River basins.

Description
Hemiodontichthys acipenserinus reaches a length of  SL. It has been reported that populations from the Amazonian region tend to be more slender than those from the Paraguay and Guaporé Rivers.

Ecology
Hemiodontichthys acipenserinus is a sand dweller that lives partially buried in the substrate, its cryptic coloration providing efficient protection. It lives on the sandy bottom where it feeds on worms and micro-crustaceans.

As with other representatives of the Loricariichthys group, mature males develop hypertrophied lips for brooding eggs. Mature males develop a huge labial veil and teeth with spoon-shaped crowns; females and juveniles, the crowns are pointed. Unlike most loricariids, they don't have well-developed odontodes on the snout and pectoral fins. Eggs are laid in a mass and held by the male in the fold made by its lips. The males bear the cluster of eggs fixed to their lips, which they provide with ventilation during movement. About one week after hatching, the alevins leave their parent's protection.

References

Loricariini
Fish of South America
Fish of Bolivia
Fish of Brazil
Fish of Peru
Fish of the Amazon basin
Fish of French Guiana
Vertebrates of Guyana
Taxa named by Pieter Bleeker
Taxa named by Rudolf Kner
Monotypic ray-finned fish genera
Catfish genera